{{DISPLAYTITLE:C6H9NO}}
The molecular formula C6H9NO may refer to:

 2-Acetyl-1-pyrroline
 Carbapenam
 N-Vinylpyrrolidone

Molecular formulas